Kimshin Myongsuk (born March 5, 1961) is a South Korean feminism activist and human rights activist, journalist and reporter for If News, a liberal feminist Korean news journal.

In her early years Kim worked as a Dong-a Ilbo journalist. In the 1990s she supported feminism movements. She worked for KBS, MBC and other TV broadcasts. In the 2000s she joined If News. Kimshin Myongsuk was appointed as an editor and director there. In 1999, she made controversial appearances on KBS.

She is known for obtaining the first doctoral degree in the field of 'A theory of Feminine God' in South Korea.

References

1961 births
South Korean feminists
South Korean human rights activists
South Korean humanitarians
South Korean civil rights activists
South Korean columnists
21st-century South Korean women writers
South Korean journalists
Living people
South Korean women journalists
South Korean women columnists